W. Q. M. Berly House is a historic home located at Lexington, Lexington County, South Carolina. It was built in 1904, and is a one-story, frame cottage with a gable roof and irregular plan. It features a cross gable with sawn bargeboard, and a hip-roofed wraparound porch.

It was listed on the National Register of Historic Places in 1983.

References 

Houses on the National Register of Historic Places in South Carolina
Houses completed in 1904
Houses in Lexington County, South Carolina
National Register of Historic Places in Lexington County, South Carolina